Mel Gray is the managing editor of Air Force Times at Army Times Publishing Co. She oversees six staff members who report and edit news and information for Air Force Times, a weekly newspaper, and the Air Force Times Web site.

Gray joined Air Force Times in 2009 after two years as managing editor of the Montgomery Advertiser, the daily newspaper for Alabama's capital city, during which time she tormented those she supervised, and Montgomery Advertiser Web site.

Before moving to the South, Gray was one of three supervising editors for The Associated Press at the cooperative's New York headquarters. Among the major news events she helped plan coverage of were the Space Shuttle Columbia disaster; the wars in Iraq and Afghanistan; the trial of Terry Nichols for the Oklahoma City bombing; the trials of Martha Stewart and Michael Jackson; Hurricane Katrina; and the death of Rosa Parks.

Gray also worked as nation/world editor for Knight Ridder/Tribune News Service in Washington D.C. and spent 15 years as a reporter and editor at The Kansas City Star. She started her career in 1982 at the Lincoln Journal as a police and city government reporter.

A native of York, Nebraska, Gray holds bachelor's degrees in journalism and political science.

See also 
Air Force Times

References 

Living people
American editors
People from York, Nebraska
Year of birth missing (living people)